The North German Federal Navy (Norddeutsche Bundesmarine or Marine des Norddeutschen Bundes), was the Navy of the North German Confederation, formed out of the Prussian Navy in 1867. It was eventually succeeded by the Imperial German Navy in 1871.

In the war against France, in 1870–1871, the navy encountered enemy forces on a few occasions. These included several minor skirmishes in the North and Baltic Seas between German coastal forces and the French blockade fleet, along with the Battle of Havana between the gunboat  and the French aviso . In general, due to its small size and frequent mechanical problems with most of the ironclad warships then in service, the navy did not play a significant role in the war. On the other hand, the French navy found it difficult to employ its far superior fleet for a landing operation at the Prussian coasts, owing to the decisive defeats the French suffered on land.

See also
 Marine-Regatta-Verein
 Navy League (Germany)
 Reichsflotte (Fleet of the Realm)
 Imperial German Navy
 Reichsmarine (Navy of the Realm)
 Kriegsmarine (War Navy)
Bundesmarine
Volksmarine
 German Navy since 1995

References
 

Naval history of Germany
North German Confederation
Disbanded navies
1860s in Germany
1870s in Germany
1867 establishments in Germany
1871 disestablishments in Germany
Military units and formations established in 1867
Military units and formations disestablished in 1871